The 1913 Notre Dame Fighting Irish football team represented the University of Notre Dame during the 1913 college football season.

Jesse Harper became head coach in 1913 and remained so until he retired in 1917. During his tenure the Irish began playing only intercollegiate games and posted a record of 34 wins, five losses, and one tie. This period also marked the beginning of the rivalry with Army and the continuation of rivalries with Michigan State. In an effort to gain respect for a regionally successful but small-time Midwestern football program, Harper scheduled games in his first season with national powerhouses Texas, Penn State, and Army.

Schedule

Season summary

Week 4: at Army
Notre Dame burst into the national consciousness and helped to transform the collegiate game in a single contest. On November 1, the Notre Dame squad stunned Army, 35–13, on The Plain at West Point. Led by quarterback Gus Dorais and future head coach Knute Rockne at end, Notre Dame attacked the Cadets with an offense that featured both the expected powerful running game but also long and accurate downfield forward passes from Dorais to Rockne.

This game has often been miscredited as the invention of the forward pass. Prior to this contest, receivers would come to a full stop and wait on the ball to come to them, but in this contest, Dorais threw to Rockne in stride, changing the forward pass from a seldom-used play into the dominant ball-moving strategy that it is today.

References

Notre Dame
Notre Dame Fighting Irish football seasons
College football undefeated seasons
Notre Dame Fighting Irish football